Andrew Samuels (born May 15, 1997) is an American soccer player.

Career

Youth and college 
Samuels played four years of college soccer at the University of Maryland between 2015 and 2018, making 78 appearances, scoring three goals and tallying seven assists.

While at college, Samuels appeared for USL Premier Development League side Tampa Bay Rowdies U23 in 2017.

Professional 
On January 11, 2019, Samuels was selected 33rd overall in the 2019 MLS SuperDraft by Houston Dynamo. On March 8, 2019, Samuels signed for Houston's USL Championship affiliate side Rio Grande Valley FC Toros.

References

External links 
  Maryland bio
 
 https://www.uslchampionship.com/andrew-samuels
https://www.espn.com/soccer/player/_/id/231068/andrew-samuels

1997 births
Living people
American soccer players
Association football defenders
Houston Dynamo FC draft picks
Maryland Terrapins men's soccer players
Rio Grande Valley FC Toros players
Soccer players from Tampa, Florida
Tampa Bay Rowdies U23 players
USL Championship players
USL League Two players